Hamburg is the name of the following places in the U.S. state of Indiana:
Hamburg, Clark County, Indiana
Hamburg, Franklin County, Indiana